Andrew George Allen (born 5 April 1967) is a former Welsh international rugby union player.

Allen was born in Newport), and played 3 times for Wales in 1990 as a Lock.

Notes

Living people
1967 births
Wales international rugby union players
Rugby union locks
Rugby union players from Newport, Wales
Newbridge RFC players
Newport RFC players
Ebbw Vale RFC players
Barbarian F.C. players